Joel Holmes VC (1821 – 27 July 1872) was an English recipient of the Victoria Cross, the highest and most prestigious award for gallantry in the face of the enemy that can be awarded to British and Commonwealth forces.

Details
He was about 36 years old, and a private in the 84th Regiment (later The 2nd Battalion, York and Lancaster Regiment), British Army during the Indian Mutiny when the following deed took place on 25 September 1857 at Lucknow, India for which he was awarded the VC.

Private Joel HolmesFor distinguished conduct in volunteering to assist in working a gun of Captain Maude's Battery, under heavy fire, from which gun nearly all the artillerymen had been shot away. (Extract from Field Force Orders of the late Major-General Havelock, dated 17 October 1857.)

The medal
His Victoria Cross is displayed at The York & Lancaster Regiment Museum at Rotherham, South Yorkshire, England.

References

External links
Location of grave and VC medal (West Yorkshire)

1821 births
1872 deaths
People from Halifax, West Yorkshire
British recipients of the Victoria Cross
York and Lancaster Regiment soldiers
Indian Rebellion of 1857 recipients of the Victoria Cross
British Army recipients of the Victoria Cross